Robert Thwaites is a former graphic designer from the United Kingdom who gave up work due to failing eyesight in the late nineties. He turned to faking Victorian paintings in order to put his son through private school. Without any formal training he sold two paintings including one to an Antiques Roadshow expert. He was caught out while trying to sell a third. He was sentenced to two years in prison on 19 September 2006.

References
 "Untrained painter conned art world with fakes" article at www.theindependent.co.uk
 "TV expert paid £20,000 for forger's worthless painting" article at www.timesonline.co.uk

English art forgers
Year of birth missing (living people)
Living people